Ned Marin (May 17, 1896 – November 11, 1955), was an American producer and screenwriter. He produced 16 films between 1923 and 1937.

He was born in New Jersey, United States and died in Hollywood, California. He is the grandfather of artist Alden Marin, and casting director and producer Mindy Marin.

Selected filmography

 The Isle of Lost Ships (1923)
 Waterfront (1928)
 Night Watch (1928)
 Yellow Lily (1928)
 Adoration (1928)
 Her Private Life (1929)
 The Girl in the Glass Cage (1929)
 Love and the Devil (1929)
 Careers (1929)
 Dark Streets (1929)
 Women Everywhere (1930)
 No, No, Nanette (1930)
 The Golden Calf (1930)
 The Band Plays On (1934)
 Pursuit (1935)
 The Garden Murder Case (1936)
 Moonlight Murder (1936)
 Under Cover of Night (1937)

External links

1896 births
1955 deaths
American male screenwriters
People from New Jersey
20th-century American male writers
20th-century American screenwriters